William Henry Harrison Hart (January 25, 1848 – December 24, 1918) was the 16th California Attorney General.  Prior to this position, he claims to have been a United States Secret Service agent and may have fought in the American Civil War.

Personal information
Few verifiable facts are known about Hart's early life and background, except for information he provided himself and is open to question. Hart claimed to have been kidnapped by the Blackhawk Indians at the age of four. At age eleven, he was then orphaned. Hart struggled through a difficult childhood which led to his desire for danger and his allegedly joining the United States Secret Service at only age 14. Hart also claimed to have fought for the Union during the Civil War. From 1891 to 1895, Hart served one term as Attorney General of the state of California.
Hart was a prominent figure in the California phase of the Mystery airship wave of 1896–97, claiming to represent the airship's inventor.

Career
On November 4, 1890, Hart was elected as California Attorney General and took office on January 5, 1891. He served  a single term.

Death
William H. H. Hart died at age 70 on December 24, 1918, a victim of the 1918 flu pandemic.

External links
Brief biography with picture

References

1848 births
1903 deaths
California Attorneys General
United States Secret Service agents
Deaths from Spanish flu